José Armando Bermúdez Rochet (28 April 1871  – 4 October 1941) was a Dominican businessman and the founder of J. Armando Bermúdez & Co., C. por A. The José Armando Bermúdez National Park is named in his honour.

He was born on 28 April 1871 to Erasmo Bermúdez Jiménez (1825–1907), a Venezuelan immigrant, and Petronila Rochet Gómez (1839–1889), the daughter of a French immigrant of Belgian Walloon and French descent.

In 1899 he married Ana Luisa Ramos de Peña and begat six children, all males: José Ignacio (1899–1968), Aquiles (1901–1970), Domingo Octavio (1902–1967), Luis Francisco "Frank" (1904–1949), Víctor Manuel "Tontón" (1906–1959) and Fernando Arturo (1909–1955).

Bermúdez died on 4 October 1941.

Notes

References 

Place of birth missing
Place of death missing
Dominican Republic people of French descent
Dominican Republic people of Venezuelan descent
Dominican Republic people of Walloon descent
White Dominicans

20th-century Dominican Republic businesspeople
1871 births
1941 deaths